The  is a river in Yachiyo and Chiba, Chiba Prefecture, Japan. The upper part of the drainage facility is designated as the Shin River. The lower part, the Hanami, ranges from the Ōwada Drainage Pump Station in Yachiyo City, and drains into Tokyo Bay in the Mihama Ward of Chiba City. Numerous sluices have been built on the Hanami to protect the surrounding area from damage due to high tides and typhoons.

History

The Hanami River was developed as a canal in the 18th century to connect the Tone River to Tokyo Bay, control flooding in the Inbanuma marsh area, and facilitate the construction of new rice paddy areas in Shimōsa Province. The first attempt at building a canal was in 1724, but funds provided by the Tokugawa shogunate to the chief of Hirato Village, now part of Yachiyo, dried up and the project was abandoned.
In 1844 final work on the canal was completed. Within two years shallow riverboats carried rice and sweet potatoes from the Tone River area to Kemigawa Harbor, and in turn returned fertilizer up the canal to agricultural areas in its upper reaches of the Hanami. Shipping along the Hanami River declined greatly by the end of the Tokugawa period due to the construction of roads along the river. The transport of sweet potatoes for starch production in the Kemigawa area continued, however, until 1952.

Tributaries
 Katta River
 Takatsu River

Recreation
A large-scale bicycle path, the Inbanuma Bicycle Path, is under construction to span the entirety of the Inba Discharge Channel. The section of the path along the Hanami River has been designated as the Hanami Cycling Road. It is not yet complete and unpaved portions remain in Kashiwaimachi in Ichikawa and Yokoto in Chiba City.

References

Rivers of Chiba Prefecture
Rivers of Japan